Karl Duncker (2 February 1903, in Leipzig – 23 February 1940) was a German Gestalt psychologist. He attended Friedrich-Wilhelms-University from 1923 to 1923, and spent 1925–1926 at Clark University in Worcester, MA as a visiting professor, where he received a masters in arts degree. 
Until 1935 he was a student and assistant of the founders of Gestalt psychology in Berlin: Max Wertheimer,  Wolfgang Köhler and   Kurt Koffka.
In 1935, exiled by the Nazis, he got an assistantship in Cambridge with Frederic Charles Bartlett and later immigrated to the US, where he was again an assistant of  Wolfgang Köhler’s at Swarthmore College.  He committed suicide in 1940 at 37 years of age. He had been suffering from depression for some time and had received professional treatment.

His younger brother Wolfgang Duncker (1909–1942), a communist in exile in Moscow, was arrested in 1938 during the Great Purges and died in the Gulag. Their parents were the well-known socialist and later communist politicians and educators Hermann and Käte Duncker.

Achievements 

Duncker coined the term functional fixedness for describing the difficulties in visual perception and in problem solving that arise from the fact that one element of a whole situation already has a (fixed) function which has to be changed for making the correct perception or for finding the solution to the problem.

In his "candle problem" the situation was defined by the objects: a candle, a box of thumb-tacks and a book of matches. The task was to fix the candles on the wall without any additional elements. The difficulty of this problem arises from the functional fixedness of the box, which originally contained thumb-tacks. It is a container in the problem situation but must be used as a shelf in the solution situation.

Other examples for this type of mental restructuring are:

 an electromagnet must be used as part of a pendulum
 a branch of a tree must be used as a tool
 a brick must be used a paper weight
 another meaning of a word must be found that is different from the meaning within the context of the sentence

Publications 
 
 
 
 
 
 
 
 
 
 
  (also online at The International Society for Gestalt Theory and Its Applications)

References 

Clark University faculty
1903 births
1940 suicides
Physicians from Leipzig
German psychologists
Gestalt psychologists
German emigrants to the United States
20th-century psychologists
Suicides in the United States